Arachnura logio (Japanese: Kijiro o-hiki-gumo) is a species of scorpion spider of the family Araneidae. It ranges from China to Japan.

References

Spiders of Asia
Chelicerates of Japan
Spiders described in 1956
Araneidae